Gillis is a surname. Notable people with the surname include:

Alan Gillis (1936–2022), Irish politician
Ann Gillis (1927–2018), American actress
Brad Gillis (born 1957), American musician
Christopher Gillis (1951–1993), Canadian dancer and choreographer
Clarence Gillis (1895–1960), Canadian politician
Don Gillis (1912–1978), American composer, conductor and teacher
Don Gillis (1922–2008), American radio and television personality
Duncan Gillis (1883–1963), Canadian athlete
Gregg Gillis (born 1981), American musician known as Girl Talk
Hugh Gillis (1918–2013), American politician
James Gillis (bishop) (1802–1864), Scottish bishop
James Henry Gillis (1831–1910), Rear Admiral in the United States Navy
James Lisle Gillis (1792–1881), American politician
Jamie Gillis (1943-2010), American porn star
John Anthony Gillis (born 1975), American musician known as Jack White
John F. Gillis (1846–?), Canadian politician
John P. Gillis (1803–1873), Commodore in the United States Navy
John R. Gillis, American historian
Michael Gillis (1949–2007), American academic
Paulina Gillis, Canadian actress known as Tabitha St. Germain
Peter B. Gillis (born 1952), American comic book writer
Pieter Gillis (1486–1533), European humanist and printer
Sean Vincent Gillis (born 1962), American serial killer
Shane Gillis (born 1987), American stand-up comedian
S. Malcolm Gillis (born 1941), American academic

See also
Gilis
McGillis